Danielle Barkhouse is a Canadian politician, who was elected to the Nova Scotia House of Assembly in the 2021 Nova Scotia general election. She represents the riding of Chester-St. Margaret's as a member of the Progressive Conservative Association of Nova Scotia. Currently, Barkhouse is the Vice Chair of the Veterans Affairs Committee, Vice President of the Women’s Parliamentary Commonwealth  and Deputy Speaker. She is a member of the Community Services and Health Committees. She is also a member of the House of Assembly Management Commission.

Prior to her election to the legislature, Barkhouse was a municipal councillor in Chester.

Criticism while serving in council 
During Barkhouse's time as a councillor, the municipal council faced criticism after denying to raise the LGBTQ pride flag outside of its municipal office during pride month. The Municipality prohibited the raising due to an old policy from 2007 that prohibited what flags could be raised on municipal buildings. The policy allowed only the flags of municipal, provincial, federal and national foreign governments or the United Nations to be flown from municipal poles. The council faced immense backlash about their decision to not raise the flag, the CBC and other news sources reported on it and the council received immense backlash. The backlash attracted the attention of promonant LGBTQ2IA+ actor Eliot Page who in turn told people to call the office to tell them to overturn the rule. Barkhouse did not make a public media comment, however Allen Webber, warden for the Municipality did on behalf of the council. On July 23, one day after the CBC posted the original article that attracted the eyes of many people, the municipality overturned the controversial rule, that day the flag was raised on the side of the municipal offices.

Electoral history 

Nova Scotian Municipal politics do not have party affiliations.

References 

Year of birth missing (living people)
Living people
Progressive Conservative Association of Nova Scotia MLAs
Women MLAs in Nova Scotia
Nova Scotia municipal councillors
21st-century Canadian politicians
21st-century Canadian women politicians